The West End is a part of Richmond, Virginia.  Definitions of the bounds of the West End vary, it may include only the western part of the city of Richmond or extend as far as western Henrico County. As there is no one municipal organization that represents this specific region, the boundaries are loosely defined as being north of the James River, west of I-195, and south of Broad Street. Historically, the Richmond neighborhoods of the Fan and the Museum District were a part of the West End. A primary conduit through the West End is Interstate 64.

Geographic description 
This section is arranged by exits off Interstate 64. In previous decades, the term "The West End" generally referred to the western area of the city itself. However, in recent years, the urbanized area has expanded residentially and commercially into Henrico County, and new developments in the western portion of the city and county in combination are now also considered to be part of "The West End."

A common tool of differentiation used locally is to refer to the westernmost part (generally beginning at the Richmond-Henrico Line going west to Short Pump) as "The Far West End," and to refer to the section closer to and within the city limits as "The Near West End" or "Westhampton."

In addition to Richmond, Virginia addresses, the West End includes the census-designated places of part of Glen Allen, and all of 
Short Pump, Tuckahoe, and Wyndham.

Staples Mill Road, Willow Lawn, and Westhampton
 Exit 185 - US-33/Staples Mill Rd
 Anthem

Broad and Glenside
183C - U.S. 250 West - Broad St./Glenside Dr. North
183B - U.S. 250 East - Broad St
183A - Glenside Dr. South
Genworth and Philip Morris USA
 Chinatown at Horsepen Road

Parham Road
181B - Parham Rd. North
181A - Parham Rd. South

Gaskins Road and Innsbrook
Exit 180B - Gaskins Rd. North
Exit 180A - Gaskins Rd. South
Former Circuit City corporate headquarters

Short Pump
Exit 178B - U.S. 250 East - Richmond
Exit 178A - U.S. 250 West - Short Pump
MeadWestvaco

I-295 and Nuckols Road
Wyndham, a major residential development
Henrico County landfill

Parks and recreation
Cheswick Park
Deep Run Park
Echo Lake
Short Pump
Springfield
 Dogwood Park
 Bandy Field Nature Park
 Twin Hickory Park

Education

Elementary schools
Dumbarton Elementary Schools
Richmond Public Schools
Mary Munford Elementary School
Henrico County Public Schools
Crestview Elementary School
Echo Lake Elementary School
Gayton Elementary School
Jackson Davis Elementary School
Johnson Elementary School
Longan Elementary School
Maybeury Elementary School
Nuckols Farm Elementary School
Pemberton Elementary School
Pinchbeck Elementary School
Rivers Edge Elementary School
Ridge Elementary School
Ruby F. Carver Elementary School
Shady Grove Elementary School
Short Pump Elementary School
Skipwith Elementary School
Springfield Park Elementary School
Tuckahoe Elementary School
Twin Hickory Elementary School
Colonial Trail Elementary School

Middle schools
Richmond Public Schools
Albert Hill Middle School
Henrico County Public Schools
Quioccasin Middle School (formally known as Harry Flood Byrd Middle School)
Short Pump Middle School
Tuckahoe Middle School
Pocahontas Middle School
Brookland Middle School
Hungary Creek Middle School
George H. Moody Middle School
Mount Vernon Middle School

High schools
Richmond Public Schools
Thomas Jefferson High School
Richmond Community High School
Open High School
Henrico County Public Schools
Glen Allen High School
Deep Run High School
Douglas S. Freeman High School
Hermitage High School
John Randolph Tucker High School
Mills E. Godwin High School

Private and parochial schools

Collegiate School
Rudlin Torah Academy (Richmond, Virginia)
Shaarei Torah of Richmond (girl-identifying)
St. Catherine's School (girl-identifying)
St. Christopher's School (boy-identifying)

The Steward School
The Benjamin and Lillian Rochkind Yeshiva of Virginia (boys)
The Faison School for Autism
Dominion School for Autism

Colleges and universities
 University of Richmond
 Strayer University West End Campus
 Virginia Commonwealth University

Culture

Museums
 Virginia Museum of Fine Arts
 Virginia Historical Society
 Virginia House, a historic house museum operated by the Virginia Historical Society
 Wilton House Museum

Theater and entertainment
 Byrd Theatre
Agecroft Hall
The Cultural Arts Center at Glen Allen
Innsbrook After Hours, an annual summer series concert

Commerce
The principal non-interstate east-west commercial corridors are located along Broad Street (U.S. Highway 250) and Patterson Avenue (State Route 6) each of which extends from the Richmond City Limits westerly through Henrico County into Goochland County. There are many restaurants, businesses and shopping centers, mostly located along or near the three major thoroughfares (Broad Street road and Patterson Avenue runs east-west, Parham runs north-south ). Several major clusters include:

Willow Lawn Shopping Center just west of city limits at Broad Street and Staples Mill Road. One of the first large shopping centers when first opened in the late 1950s, Willow Lawn has been substantially reconfigured and rebuilt to a semi-shopping mall configuration, and includes major stores, small shops, and a food court.
"The Village" shopping center at Three Chopt and Patterson (near the University of Richmond). It is currently home to CVS/pharmacy, Martin's, Moe's Southwest Grill, Starbucks, and Subway among other venues.
Westhampton historic commercial district extending from the Patterson and Libbie intersection to the Libbie and Grove shopping district, where one can find cafés and upscale clothing boutiques.
Regency Square Mall and Westbury Shopping Center -- This area includes many locally-owned and chain restaurants, including Westbury Pharmacy, former workplace of Elliott Yamin. This area is adjacent to Douglas S. Freeman High School.
Short Pump Town Center An "open air shopping mall" (classified as a "lifestyle center") opened in 2003 on Broad Street, approximately 1 mile (1.6 km) west of I-64 Exit 178A/B. Anchor stores are Nordstrom, Dillard's, Macy's and Dick's Sporting Goods.

Industry
 Innsbrook Business Park, a  business park that opened in 1982 and houses several Fortune 500 companies. 
 West Creek Business Park,  originally developed for a Motorola plant that never materialized. . West Creek is now home to the CarMax Home Office and Capital One. It is also a popular place for weekend bikers.

Other
The Country Club of Virginia. Churches, schools, and houses surround this development at the corner of Three Chopt and River Road. Long ago, this area was the town of Rio Vista, Virginia.
Grove Avenue Baptist Church, at the highest point in the Richmond-Metropolitan area 
The Rotary Club of West Richmond. A service organization which meets in Richmond's West End.

External links 
Neighborhood news blog
Detailed exit numbers

Neighborhoods in Richmond, Virginia